Abortion in Wisconsin was made illegal after the overturning of Roe v. Wade by the Supreme Court of the United States on June 24, 2022, except when the life of the mother is in danger. 

53% of Wisconsin adults said in a poll in 2014 by the Pew Research Center that abortion should be legal in all or most cases with 45% saying it should be illegal in all or most cases. The Center for Reproductive Rights labels the state as hostile towards abortion rights, e.g. 20-week ban, telemedicine ban, TRAP requirements, admitting privileges requirement, transfer agreement requirement, reporting requirement, parental consent required, mandatory counseling, mandatory ultrasound, and waiting period requirements.

History

Legislative history 

In 1849, the state legislature passed a law that criminalized abortion, making it a felony for a doctor to perform an abortion on a woman, no matter the circumstances of her pregnancy including pregnancy as a result of rape or incest, unless the pregnancy endangers the life of the mother. In the 19th century, bans by state legislatures on abortion were about protecting the life of the mother given the number of deaths caused by abortions; state governments saw themselves as looking out for the lives of their citizens.

By 1950, the state legislature would pass a law stating that a woman who had an abortion or actively sought to have an abortion, regardless of whether she went through with it, was guilty of a criminal offense.

The Wisconsin law “Wisconsin Stat. § 940.15”, enacted in 1985, made abortion a crime only after viability, and allowed abortion after viability “if the abortion is necessary to preserve the life or health of the woman, as determined by reasonable medical judgment of the woman’s attending physician.”

The state was one of 23 states in 2007 to have a detailed abortion-specific informed consent requirement. Georgia and Wisconsin were 2 of the only 22 states with written informed consent materials referring women to  "crisis pregnancy centers" which acknowledged these centers did not support or provide women with abortion related services.

As of 2013, state Targeted Regulation of Abortion Providers (TRAP) law applied to medication induced abortions in addition to abortion clinics.

Following the passage of a 2013 Wisconsin law requiring abortion providers to have admitting privileges at a nearby hospital, three Catholic hospital systems in the state intended to deny admitting privileges to abortion providers. Wisconsin's attorney general said this intent violated the Church Amendment of 1973, which prohibits hospitals receiving federal funds from discriminating against a doctor on the basis of whether or not the doctor provides abortions or sterilizations.

Five bills sought to outlaw abortion in Wisconsin in 2019. As of mid-May 2019, state law banned abortion after week 22.  In 2019, Governor Tony Evers vetoed four Republican passed bills that would have limited abortion access. Specifically, the legislature passed a measure requiring abortion physicians to provide information on abortion reversal, a procedure that the scientific community sees as illegitimate and invalid, as it is not based upon medically-sound research. In addition, the legislature passed a bill that would eliminate all government funding for Planned Parenthood, as well as a ban on all abortions based upon the race, sex, or genetic anomaly of the fetus. Evers also vetoed a bill that would sentence doctors to life in prison for failing to provide infants with medical care if they are born alive during a botched abortion attempt. As of 2019, the state had a legal 24 hour waiting period before a woman could get an abortion.
Wisconsin banned abortion immediately after the 2022 Supreme Court decision overturning Roe v Wade, per a state law that automatically caused abortion to be banned if Roe v Wade was repealed.

Judicial history 

In March of 1970, Wisconsin’s Eastern District Court granted a declaratory judgment, stating the Wisconsin's contemporary abortion law was unconstitutionally vague. However, this did not prohibit prosectors from charging the plaintiff using different laws, or from enforcing the same law against different plaintiffs. The plaintiff was subsequently recharged for violating Wisconsin's law against abortion. In November of 1970, Wisconsin’s Eastern District Court granted an injunction forbidding the prosecution of any person under Wisconsin's law against abortion - making abortion legal in Wisconsin.  The annotations in Wisconsin's abortion statue list the March 1970 declaratory judgement as the point where Wisconsin's abortion ban was overturned, despite prosecutions and indictments for abortion occurring until the November, 1970 injunction against enforcement. 

The US Supreme Court's decision in 1973's Roe v. Wade ruling affirmed the ban issued by the Wisconsin East District. (However, the Supreme Court overturned Roe v. Wade in Dobbs v. Jackson Women's Health Organization,  later in 2022.) 

In 2015, the 7th U.S. Circuit Court of Appeals upheld a decision to strike down the admitting privileges requirement of Act 37, passed in 2013. Admitting privileges require physicians providing abortion to obtain the right to admit patients at local hospitals – although federal law dictates that no hospital can deny a patient admittance. Wisconsin already had a transfer agreement requirement established, which mandates that all facilities where abortion is performed to have an agreement with a local hospital for the transfer of patients. Most in public health and clinical practice understand admitting privilege requirements – adopted by nine states, including Wisconsin – to be nonessential, and not grounded in evidence-based practice. Further, as argued during the court proceedings, the law would lead to diminished access to abortion within the state, particularly as the law was to go into effect two days after its passage.

After a District Court ordered an immediate temporary injunction, the 7th U.S. Circuit Court granted a hearing of the case. The state's primary argument in defense of the admitting privileges requirement centers on women's health. Specifically, if complications arise, this requirement presumes a continuity of care for the patient. The court's ruling, however, determined that the remarkably low rates of complications associated with abortion, and the state's failure to impose similar requirements on physicians providing riskier procedures rendered these claims moot. Following the 7th U.S. Circuit Court's ruling, the state of Wisconsin petitioned the Supreme Court for review of the case; the Supreme Court chose not to hear the case, leaving the 7th Circuit Court's ruling in place.

Clinic history 

Between 1982 and 1992, the number of abortion clinics in the state declined by 13, going from 29 in 1982 to 16 in 1992. In 2013, Affiliated Medical Services was located in Milwaukee at 1428 N. Farwell Ave.  Women going to the clinic often had to be accompanied as there were protesters outside. In 2014, there were 4 abortion clinics in the state. In 2014, 96% of the counties in the state did not have an abortion clinic. That year, 67% of women in the state aged 15–44 lived in a county without an abortion clinic. In March 2016, there were 22 Planned Parenthood clinics in the state. In 2017, there were 21 Planned Parenthood clinics, of which 2 offered abortion services, in a state with a population of 1,270,774 women aged 15–49.

On April 1, 2012, a bomb exploded on the windowsill of a Planned Parenthood clinic in Grand Chute, Wisconsin, resulting in a fire that caused minimal damage.

Statistics 
In the period between 1972 and 1974, there were zero recorded illegal abortion deaths in the state. In 1990, there were 577,000 women in the state at risk of an unintended pregnancy. In 2001, Arizona, Florida, Iowa, Louisiana, Massachusetts, and Wisconsin did not provide any residence related data regarding abortions performed in the state to the Centers for Disease Control. In 2013, among white women aged 15–19, there were 570 abortions, 200 abortions for black women aged 15–19, 90 abortions for Hispanic women aged 15–19, and 80 abortions for women of all other races. In 2014, 53% of adults said in a poll by the Pew Research Center that abortion should be legal in all or most cases with 45% stating it should be legal in all or most cases. In 2017, the state had an infant mortality rate of 6.4 deaths per 1,000 live births.

Abortion rights views and activities

Organizations 
Wisconsin Alliance for Reproductive Health is an organization that supports abortion rights.  In May 2019, they were active in trying to overturn Wisconsin's 1849 era abortion ban.

Views 
Wisconsin Alliance for Reproductive Health Executive Director Sara Finger said, "Wisconsin is not recognized as having some of the harshest abortion laws, but we're right up there with Texas and some others who do have that reputation."

Activities 
On January 27, 2013, Planned Parenthood of Wisconsin marked the 40th anniversary of Roe v. Wade with an event titled "Our Lives. Our Stories. Our Celebration" at the Majestic Theater in Madison.

Protests 
Women from the state participated in marches supporting abortion rights as part of a #StoptheBans movement in May 2019.

Violence 
On May 8, 2022 a crisis pregnancy center in Madison, Wisconsin was firebombed. The attack was claimed by Jane's Revenge, a militant pro-abortion rights group. In a statement issued after the attack, the group demanded the disbanding of anti-abortion organizations, with a threat of "increasingly extreme attacks", including a "Night of Rage" should Roe v. Wade be overturned by the Supreme Court.

Anti-abortion rights view and activities

Activism 
Much of the anti-abortion movement in the United States and around the world finds support in the Roman Catholic Church, the Christian right, the Lutheran Church–Missouri Synod and the Wisconsin Evangelical Lutheran Synod, the Church of England, the Anglican Church in North America, the Eastern Orthodox Church, and the Church of Jesus Christ of Latter-day Saints (LDS).

Specifically, organizations such as Pro-Life Wisconsin, Wisconsin Right to Life, and the Wisconsin Catholic Conference are actively working to limit or restrict access to abortion access within the state of Wisconsin. They all engage in outreach and education campaigns directed towards the general public, fundraising activities, and resources to churches and Pastors for use in their own ministry. Further, each organization engages in policy and legal efforts to limit access to abortion, whether it is through testimonials before the state legislature on bills related to abortion, or assistance in court cases that challenge existing abortion restrictions.

Protests 
Protesters were regularly outside Affiliated Medical Services in 2013.  They had also bought a large Clearchannel billboard across the street from the clinic.

References 

Wisconsin
Healthcare in Wisconsin
Women in Wisconsin